The Central Missouri Mules football program represents the University of Central Missouri in college football and competes in the NCAA Division II. In 1912, Central Missouri was a charter member of the Mid-America Intercollegiate Athletics Association (MIAA), and has remained in the league. UCM's home games are played at Audrey J. Walton Stadium in Warrensburg, Missouri.

Central Missouri's football program dates back to 1894, and has won eight conference championships, and appeared in the NCAA Division II playoffs twice in 2002, and 2010. Entering the 2015 season, Central Missouri's all-time record was 529–507–52.

The team is coached by Josh Lamberson.

Conference affiliations
 1912–present: Mid-America Intercollegiate Athletics Association

Championships
 Conference championships (9)

Playoff appearances

NCAA Division II 
The Mules have made four appearances in the NCAA Division II playoffs, with a combined record of 3-4.

Stadium

The Mules have played their home games at Audrey J. Walton Stadium since 1928. The current capacity of the stadium is at 10,000.

All-time record vs. current MIAA teams
Official record (including any NCAA imposed vacates and forfeits) against all current MIAA opponents as of the end of the 2015 season:

Alumni in professional football

 Jeff Wright – DT – Drafted by the Buffalo Bills in round 8 of the 1988 NFL Draft. Played through 1994 and started at nose tackle in four Super Bowls.
 Colston Weatherington – DE – Drafted in the seventh round of the 2001 NFL Draft by the Dallas Cowboys. He was released by the Cowboys in 2003, but signed as a free agent with the Dallas Desperados of the Arena Football League.  He was named Defensive Lineman of the Year for the AFL in 2006 and in 2008.
 Toby Korrodi – QB – Signed as an undrafted free agent by the Arizona Cardinals immediately after the 2007 NFL Draft. Released in August 2007.
 Roderick Green – OLB – Selected by the Baltimore Ravens in the fifth round of the 2004 NFL Draft, the highest any UCM football player has ever been drafted. Green played with the San Francisco 49ers in 2006, where he had 4.5 sacks as a pass-rush specialist.
 Delanie Walker – TE – Selected as the sixth pick of the sixth round in the 2006 NFL Draft by the San Francisco 49ers.
 Todd Devoe – WR – Signed onto the Baltimore Ravens practice squad in 2003.  Also spent time on the practice squads of the Tennessee Titans and Miami Dolphins. In 2005, he signed with the Denver Broncos and had nine catches, including one touchdown.
 Dennis Gile – QB- Mules quarterback from 2001 to 2002. Played for several professional teams

References

External links
 

 
American football teams established in 1894
1894 establishments in Missouri